John Earman (born 1942) is an American philosopher of physics. He is an emeritus professor in the History and Philosophy of Science department at the University of Pittsburgh. He has also taught at the University of California, Los Angeles, Rockefeller University, and the University of Minnesota, and was president of the Philosophy of Science Association.

Life and career

John Earman was born in Washington, D.C. in 1942. Earman received his PhD at Princeton University in 1968 with a dissertation on temporal asymmetry (titled Some Aspects of Temporal Asymmetry) and it was directed by Carl Gustav Hempel and Paul Benacerraf. After holding professorships at UCLA, the Rockefeller University, and the University of Minnesota, he joined the faculty of the History and Philosophy of Science department of the University of Pittsburgh in 1985. He remained at Pittsburgh for the rest of his career.

Earman is a former president of the Philosophy of Science Association and a fellow of the American Academy of Arts and Sciences, and of the American Association for the Advancement of Sciences.  He is a member of the Archive Board of the Phil-Sci Archive.

The hole argument

Earman has notably contributed to debate about the "hole argument". The hole argument was invented for different purposes by Albert Einstein late in 1913 as part of his quest for the general theory of relativity (GTR). It was revived and reformulated in the modern context by John3 (a short form for the "three Johns": John Earman, John Stachel, and John Norton).

With the GTR, the traditional debate between absolutism and relationalism has been shifted to whether or not spacetime is a substance, since the GTR largely rules out the existence of, e.g., absolute positions. The "hole argument" offered by John Earman is a powerful argument against manifold substantialism.

This is a technical mathematical argument but can be paraphrased as follows:

Over ,  comes to differ from identity by a smooth function.

With use of this function  we can construct two mathematical models, where the second is generated by applying  to proper elements of the first, such that the two models are identical prior to the time , where  is a time function created by a foliation of spacetime, but differ after .

These considerations show that, since substantialism allows the construction of holes, that the universe must, on that view, be indeterministic. Which, Earman argues, is a case against substantialism, as the case between determinism or indeterminism should be a question of physics, not of our commitment to substantialism.

Bibliography

Books

Selected articles
 
"In the Beginning, At the End, and All in Between: Cosmological Aspects of Time," F. Stadler and M. Stöltzner (eds.), Time and History: Proceedings of the 28th International Ludwig Wittgenstein Symposium (Ontos-Verlag, 2006).

See also
American philosophy
List of American philosophers

References

1942 births
20th-century American non-fiction writers
20th-century American philosophers
20th-century essayists
21st-century American non-fiction writers
21st-century American philosophers
21st-century essayists
American male essayists
American male non-fiction writers
American philosophy academics
Analytic philosophers
Lakatos Award winners
Living people
Philosophers of cosmology
Philosophers of science
Philosophy writers
University of Pittsburgh faculty
20th-century American male writers
21st-century American male writers